Fata Tamati was a Western Samoan chief and politician. He served as a member of the Legislative Assembly from 1948 to 1951.

Biography
When the Legislative Assembly was established in 1948, Tamati was chosen to represent Tuamasaga by the three Fautua (high chiefs). He was not re-elected in 1951.

References

Samoan chiefs
Members of the Legislative Assembly of Samoa